Repentigny may refer to:

 Repentigny, Calvados, a commune of the département of Calvados, in France
 Repentigny, Quebec, an off-island suburb of Montreal, Quebec, Canada
 Repentigny (electoral district), a Canadian electoral district taking in the Repentigny, Quebec area
 Repentigny (provincial electoral district), a Quebec electoral district taking in the Repentigny, Quebec area

es:Repentigny